Xiao-Xiao Wang (born 12 April 1981) is a Chinese-born table tennis player who represented Canada at the 2000 Summer Olympics. Her doubles partner Chris Xu was also from her hometown Harbin in China.

References

External links

Chinese emigrants to Canada
Naturalized citizens of Canada
Table tennis players at the 2000 Summer Olympics
Naturalised table tennis players
Table tennis players from Harbin
1981 births
Living people
Canadian female table tennis players
Olympic table tennis players of Canada